Itariri is a municipality in the state of São Paulo in Brazil. The population is 17,598 (2020 est.) in an area of 273.67 km². The elevation is 55 m. Itariri is situated on the BR-101 highway, 18 km west of the coastal city Peruíbe.

The municipality contains a small part of the  Juréia-Itatins Ecological Station, a strictly protected area of well-preserved Atlantic Forest created in 1986.

References

External links
  http://www.itariri.sp.gov.br
  citybrazil.com.br
  Portal Nosso São Paulo

Municipalities in São Paulo (state)